The Giro del Casentino is a one-day road cycling race that has been held annually since 1910 in the Casentino, a valley in Arezzo. From 2005 through 2010, the competition was part of the UCI Europe Tour as a category 1.2 event. Since 2011 it has been reserved to amateurs.

Winners

References

Men's road bicycle races
Recurring sporting events established in 1910
1910 establishments in Italy
Cycle races in Italy
UCI Europe Tour races